Camellia cuspidata, also known by the common name cuspidate camellia, is a species in the genus Camellia, in the family Theaceae. It is native to China, specifically the west. It occurs in the provinces of Anhui, Fujian, Guangdong, Guangxi, Guizhou, Hubei, Hunan, Jiangxi, Shaanxi, Sichuan, Yunnan, Zhejiang.

Description
C. cuspidata is an evergreen shrub which reaches up to 3 metres in height at maturity. It leaves are a glossy dark green, and its flowers, which measure 2-3 centimetres across, are pure white. It flowers from December-April, and fruits from August-October.

Etymology
Camellia is named for Georg Joseph Kamel (1661-1706), a Jesuit missionary, pharmacist and naturalist.

Cuspidata means 'suddenly narrowed to a short, rigid tip', like a canine tooth.

Gallery

References

External links
 
 

cuspidata
Flora of China